Al Ducharme is an American stand-up comedian.  Ducharme is known for voicing  the character Anthony on Bill Burr's animated F Is for Family on Netflix and for America's Got Talent.  Ducharme was the original host of Mission: Organization on HGTV. 

He can be heard on the Bernie and Al Podcast.

Personal life 
Ducharme married comedian Bernadette Pauley in 2004.

References

External links 

 Al Ducharme's Official Website
 
 The Bernie and Al Podcast
 Al Ducharme Spineless and Lovin' It reviews
 Al Ducharme: The incredible entertainer by Maya Jarjour 
 Al Ducharme was a guest on the Jay Grayce Show

Year of birth missing (living people)
Living people
American stand-up comedians
Place of birth missing (living people)